Ian Byrne is an Irish hurler who plays as a left wing-forward for the Wexford senior team.

Born in Ferns, County Wexford, Byrne first played competitive hurling during his schooling at FCJ Secondary School in Bunclody. He arrived on the inter-county scene at the age of sixteen when he first linked up with the Wexford minor team before later joining the under-21 side. He made his senior debut during the 2014 league. Byrne has since gone on to become a regular member of the team.

At club level, Byrne plays with Ferns St Aidan's.

Honours
FCJ Bunclody
South Leinster Juvenile Hurling 'B' Championship (1): 2007.

Wexford
Leinster Senior Hurling Championship (1): 2019.
Leinster Under-21 Hurling Championship (1): 2013.

References

Year of birth missing (living people)
Living people
Ferns St Aidan's hurlers
People from Ferns
Wexford inter-county hurlers